Sir Paul Anthony Mellars  (29 October 1939 – 7 May 2022) was a British archaeologist and professor of prehistory and human evolution at the University of Cambridge.

Early life and academic career
Paul Mellars was born in 1939 in the village of Swallownest near Sheffield. His father, Herbert Mellars, was a miner and a member of the Plymouth Brethren. From the village school, he progressed to Woodhouse, a County Council Grammar School founded in 1909 in the West Riding of Yorkshire, which his mother Elaine (née Batty) had also attended. (Woodhouse has subsequently been incorporated into the newly built Aston Academy in Swallownest.) Mellars obtained his MA, PhD and ScD degrees at the University of Cambridge, where he was a student at Fitzwilliam College. He married his wife Anny in 1969, having first met in an archaeological field trip in the Dordogne in 1964.

After his PhD, Mellars taught for ten years in the Archaeology Department at Sheffield University before returning to Cambridge in 1980, where he became a fellow of Corpus Christi College. He briefly served as acting master of the college in 2007, following the resignation of Sir Alan Wilson, but six months later lost the election to become the formal successor to Wilson to Oliver Rackham. He has held visiting positions at the Binghamton University and the Australian National University.

He served as president of the Prehistoric Society. He was also a trustee of the ACE Foundation.

Research
Mellars' recent research concentrated on the behaviour and archaeology of Neanderthal populations in Europe, and their replacement by Homo sapiens 40,000 years ago. Mellars contributed to the three-part BBC mini-series "Dawn of Man – The Story of Human Evolution" (2000).

He also studied the way in which mesolithic hunter-gatherer populations in Britain adapted to climate changes following the last ice age. He carried out excavations on early Mesolithic sites at Oronsay in the Inner Hebrides in Scotland and published the results from work at Star Carr in North Yorkshire.

Honours
Mellars was elected a Fellow of the Society of Antiquaries (FSA) in 1977, a Fellow of the British Academy (FBA) in 1990 and a member of the Academia Europaea in 1999. In 2004, he was appointed an Officier of the Ordre des Palmes académiques by the French Government. In 2006, he was awarded the Grahame Clark Medal by the British Academy.

He was knighted in the 2010 New Year Honours for services to scholarship.

Selected publications

References

External links

Project description of excavations at Starr Carr
University of Cambridge home page
Corpus Christi College home page
Entry for Paul Mellars, British Academy

1939 births
2022 deaths
British anthropologists
British archaeologists
Prehistorians
Human evolution theorists
Fellows of the British Academy
Academics of the University of Sheffield
Alumni of Fitzwilliam College, Cambridge
Fellows of Corpus Christi College, Cambridge
Knights Bachelor
Recipients of the Grahame Clark Medal
Officiers of the Ordre des Palmes Académiques
People from the Metropolitan Borough of Rotherham
Fellows of the Society of Antiquaries of London